Lebanon competed at the 1952 Summer Olympics in Helsinki, Finland. Nine competitors, all men, took part in eight events in four sports.

Medalists

Silver
 Zakaria Chihab — Wrestling, Men's Greco-Roman Bantamweight

Bronze
 Khalil Taha — Wrestling, Men's Greco-Roman Welterweight

Boxing

Shooting

Three shooteres represented Lebanon in 1952.

50 m pistol
 Abdel Sattar Tarabulsi
 Khalil Hilmi

50 m rifle, prone
 Abdullah Jaroudi Sr.

Weightlifting

Wrestling

References

External links
Official Olympic Reports
International Olympic Committee results database

Nations at the 1952 Summer Olympics
1952
1952 in Lebanese sport